The 2007–08 VMI Keydets basketball team represented the Virginia Military Institute during the 2007-08 NCAA Division I men's basketball season. The Keydets were coached by Duggar Baucom in his 3rd year at VMI, and played their home games at Cameron Hall. It was VMI's 4th season in the Big South Conference and the Keydets' 100th season of basketball. VMI finished the year with a 14–15 record, and a 6–8 mark in league play, good for fifth place in the conference.

Roster

Schedule

|-
!colspan=9| Regular Season

|-
!colspan=9| 2008 Big South Conference men's basketball tournament

References

VMI Keydets basketball seasons
Vmi
VMI Keydets basketball team
VMI Keydets basketball team